Napoli secondo estratto is an album by Italian singer Mina, issued in 2003.

Track listing 
  - 3:34
  - 5:42
  - 4:16
  - 2:12
  - 5:09
  - 3:08
  - 3:12
  - 3:34
  - 5:21
  - 3:09
  - 5:51
  - 4:13
  - 3:44

2003 albums
Mina (Italian singer) albums